Elections to Fife County Council were held on 10 May 1949, the same day as the other county councils in Scotland. The election saw Labour win 18 of the 25 contested seats, with 5 going to the Moderates, and 2 to the Communists.

Despite these gains Labour were unable to form a majority on the council, and the Moderates (despite winning only half of the landward seats) were able to form a majority in the council due to the majorities in the town councils for Leven and Inverkeithing, both of which sent representatives to the county council.

Aggregate results

Ward results

Largo

Kinnoway and Scoonie

North Wemyss

East Wemyss

West Wemyss

Kinglassie

Auchterderran Central

Auchterderran North

Auchterderran South

Ballingry North

Ballingry Central

Ballingry South

Kelty

Oakfield

Auchtertool

Markinch East

Markinch North

Markinch South

Charlestown

Halbeath

Dunfermline North

Carnock & Saline

Torryburn

Culross

Kincardine

References 

1949
1949 Scottish local elections